Tapa Shotor, also Tape Shotor or Tapa-e-shotor ("Camel Hill"), was a large Sarvastivadin monastery near Hadda, Afghanistan, and is now an archaeological site. According to archaeologist Raymond Allchin, the site of Tapa Shotor suggests that the Greco-Buddhist art of Gandhara descended directly from the art of Hellenistic Bactria, as seen in Ai-Khanoum.

The site of Tapa Shotor was destroyed by arson and looted in 1992.

Stylistic analysis
In view of the style of the objects found at Tapa Shotor, particularly the clay figures, Allchin suggests that either Bactrian artists came and worked for Buddhist monasteries, or that local artists had become "fully conversant" in Hellenistic art. This opinion was confirmed by the archaeologist who excavated the site Tarzi: "in the light of the latest discoveries there is no longer any doubt about the prolongation of the Graeco-Bactrian artistic past". According to Tarzi, Tapa Shotor, with clay sculptures dated to the 2nd century CE, represents the "missing link" between the Hellenistic art of Bactria, and the later stucco sculptures found at Hadda, usually dated to the 3rd-4th century CE. The sculptures of Tapa Shortor are also contemporary with many of the early Buddhist sculptures found in Gandhara. 

Traditionally, the influx of artists conversant in Hellenistic art has been attributed to the migration of the Greek populations from the Greco-Bactrian cities of Ai-Khanoum and Takht-i Sangin. Tarzi further suggested that Greek populations were established in the plains of Jalalabad, which included Hadda, around the Hellenistic city of Dionysopolis, and that they were responsible for the Buddhist creations of Tapa Shotor in the 2nd century CE.

Chronology
According to archaeologist Zemaryalai Tarzi, the first, pre-monastic, period of Tapa Shotor, corresponds to the reign of the Indo-Scythian king Azes II (35-12 BCE). The first Buddhist period dates to the reign of Kushan king Huvishka (155-187 CE). This period correspond to the creation of vihara, and niches 1, 2 and 3 in particular. The period after Vasudeva I to the last Kushans (225-350 CE) saw the creation of niche XIII. After the Kushans, a period of the site corresponds to the Kidarites (4th-5th century CE). The site remained inactive for about 250 years, from around 500 to 750 CE. A last period of activity followed, only marked by restorations, before the destruction of the site by fire in the 9th century CE. The period have been structured as follows:

 Tapa Shotor I: Indo-Scythian king Azes II (35-12 BCE)
 Tapa Shotor II: Kushan king Huvishka (155-187 CE). Vihara, and niches V1, V2 and V3
 Tapa Shotor III: (187-191 CE)
 Tapa Shotor IV: Vasudeva I (191-225 CE)
 Tapa Shotor V: Last Kushans (225-350 CE)
 Tapa Shotor VI: Kidarites (350-450 CE)
 Tapa Shotor VII: 5th century
 Tapa Shotor VIII: 6th century. Corresponds to the 1st period of Tape Tope Kalan.
 hiatus (6th-8th century)
 Tapa Shotor IX: mid 8th century-9th century. Destruction by fire

Excavation
The monastery was excavated by an all-Afghan archaeological team. It yielded numerous sculptures in an archaeologically intact environment, providing great insights on the art of the region. A stupa was excavated in the main courtyard.

A coin of the Indo-Greek king Menander was found in the ruins, but the abundance of finds of Kushan coinage suggest a main 4th century CE date for the site. 

Tapa Shortor had some beautiful statuary in Hellenistic style, particularly one seated Buddha attended by Herakles-Vajrapani and a Tyche-like woman holding a cornucopia, now destroyed (Niche V2). Another has an attendant reminding the portrait of Alexander the Great. Boardman suggested that the sculpture in the area might be an "incipient Buddhist sculpture in Indo-Greek style". 

Many of the statues are three-dimensional representations in-the-round, a rare instance in the area of Hadda, which related the style of Tapa Shotor to the Hellenistic art of Bactria, and to the Buddhist caves of Xinjiang such as the Mogao Caves, probably directly inspired by these. 

Various niches display scenes of the Buddha surrounded by attendants (especially niches V1, V2, V3). Niche XIII, or "Aquatic niche", also demonstrates sculpture in the round, and depicts Naga Kalika predicting the success of the Bodhisattva towards attaining enlightenment. The niche is dated to the period 250-350 CE, and is probably synchronous with the clay sculptures of Temple II in Penjikent. These sculptures are made of clay, while later sculptures molded in stucco can also be seen at the site.

External links
 Description and plan of Tapa Shotor (French)
 The famous Buddha with Herakles-Vajrapani and Tyche can be seen in

References

Central Asian Buddhist sites
Archaeological sites in Afghanistan
Former populated places in Afghanistan
Buddhism in Afghanistan
Buddhist art
Stupas in Afghanistan